

History 

St. Michael's College is a private national school which provides primary and secondary education. It was established in 2003 by W. S. R. Fernando, with the enrollment of four students.

College emblem 

The college logo symbolises the goals envisaged by its founders:

The book symbolizes wisdom and knowledge 
The star symbolizes shine with brightness
The Elephant symbolizes the strength
The key symbolizes leadership
The lamp symbolizes the light to the world

Location

St. Michael's College is situated in Homagama. College's main entrance is located at Sangabo Mawatha, Homagama while the Gate B is situated in Sunethra mawatha, Homagama.

Examinations 
After completing Grade 11 students sit the G.C.E. (Ordinary Level) Examination, Which is conducted by the department of examinations - Sri Lanka. Students proceeding further will sit the G.C.E (Advanced Level) Examination, Sri Lanka after completing Grade 13.

National schools in Sri Lanka
Schools in Colombo District